Mount Neacola (or Neacola Peak) is the unofficial name for the high point of the Neacola Mountains, the northernmost section of the Aleutian Range of Alaska. Despite its low elevation compared to many of the major Alaskan peaks, Mount Neacola is an impressive peak, due to its steep, pointed shape and its low base.

Mount Neacola was first climbed in 1991 by James Garrett, Loren Glick, and Kennan Harvey, on an expedition inspired by the intrepid Fred Beckey. They climbed a notable couloir on the West Face to the North Ridge, and thence to the summit. The route involves  of ascent, mostly on ice up to an angle of 65 degrees. New Hampshire climbers Ryan Driscoll, Justin Guarino, and Nick Aiello-Popeo have reported the first complete ascent of the north face in April 2021.


See also

List of mountain peaks of North America
List of mountain peaks of the United States
List of mountain peaks of Alaska
List of Ultras of the United States

References

Sources
 American Alpine Journal, 1992.
 Michael Wood and Colby Coombs, Alaska: a climbing guide, The Mountaineers, 2001.
 Alaska Ultra-Prominence List
 American Alpine Journal, 2021.(podcast)

External links

 Mount Neacola on Topozone
 Mount Neacola (Neacola Peak) on bivouac.com

Mountains of Kenai Peninsula Borough, Alaska
Mountains of Alaska
Lake Clark National Park and Preserve
Aleutian Range